North Main Street Historic District may refer to:

 North Main Street Historic District (Tuskegee, Alabama), listed on the National Register of Historic Places (NRHP) in Macon County
 Monticello North Main Street Historic District, Monticello, Arkansas, listed on the NRHP in Drew County
 North Main Street Historic District (Kennesaw, Georgia), listed on the NRHP in Cobb County
 North Main Street Commercial Historic District (Statesboro, Georgia), listed on the NRHP in Bulloch County
 Central Park-North Main Street Historic District, Charles City, Iowa, listed on the NRHP in Floyd County
 North Main Street Historic District (Greenville, Kentucky), listed on the NRHP in Muhlenberg County
 North Main Street Historic District (Henderson, Kentucky), listed on the NRHP in Henderson County
 North Main Street Historic District (Harrodsburg, Kentucky), listed on the NRHP in Mercer County
 North Main Street Historic District (Madisonville, Kentucky), listed on the NRHP in Hopkins County
 North Main-North Adams Historic District, Owenton, Kentucky, listed on the NRHP in Owen County
 North Main Street Historic District (Somerset, Kentucky), listed on the NRHP in Pulaski County
 North Main Street Historic District (Hattiesburg, Mississippi), listed on the NRHP in Forrest County
 North Main Street Historic District (Hannibal, Missouri), listed on the NRHP in Marion County
 North Main Street Historic District (Poplar Bluff, Missouri), listed on the NRHP in Butler County
 North Main-Bank Streets Historic District, Albion, New York, listed on the NRHP in Orleans County
 North Main Street Historic District (Canandaigua, New York), listed on the NRHP in Ontario County
 North Main Street Historic District (East Hampton, New York), listed on the NRHP in Suffolk County
 North Main Street Historic District (Moravia, New York), listed on the NRHP in Cayuga County
 North Main Street Historic District (Southampton, New York), listed on the NRHP in Suffolk County
 North Main Street Historic District (Graham, North Carolina), listed on the NRHP in Alamance County
 North Main Street Historic District (Mocksville, North Carolina), listed on the NRHP in Davie County
 North Main Avenue Historic District, Newton, North Carolina, listed on the NRHP in Catawba County
 North Main Street Historic District (Salisbury, North Carolina), listed on the NRHP in Rowan County
 North Main-North Detroit Street Historic District, Kenton, Ohio, listed on the NRHP in Hardin County
 North Main-North Gay Streets Historic District, Mount Vernon, Ohio, listed on the NRHP in Knox County
 Laverne's North Main Street District, Laverne, Oklahoma, listed on the NRHP in Harper County
 North Main Street Historic District (Bolivar, Tennessee), listed on the NRHP in Hardeman County
 Pinch-North Main Commercial District, Memphis, Tennessee, listed on the NRHP in Shelby County
 North Main Street Historic District (Mount Pleasant, Tennessee), listed on the NRHP in Maury County
 North Main Street Historic District (Fond du Lac, Wisconsin), listed on the NRHP in Fond du Lac County
 North Main Street Historic District (Janesville, Wisconsin), listed on the NRHP in Rock County
 North Main Street Historic District (Oshkosh, Wisconsin), listed on the NRHP in Winnebago County

See also
North Main Street (disambiguation)
Main Street Historic District (disambiguation)
South Main Street Historic District (disambiguation)
East Main Street Historic District (disambiguation)
West Main Street Historic District (disambiguation)